Gonialoe (the partridge aloes) is a small genus of three succulent plant species, indigenous to South Africa, Namibia and Angola. They were formerly included within the related genus Aloe. The three species are Gonialoe variegata, Gonialoe sladeniana, Gonialoe dinteri.

Taxonomy
The genus Aloe was found to be polyphyletic. It was accordingly divided into different genera: Aloe, Kumara, Aloiampelos, and Gonialoe, among others. Several recent phylogenetic studies have confirmed this division, and shown that Aloe actually consists of several relatively unrelated groups.

The same studies suggested that the closest relatives of this proposed genus were the related genera Astroloba and Tulista.

Species

The three species of this genus can easily be recognised by their compact, triangular leaves forming three vertical or spiraling ranks (trifarious).

References

External links
 
 

 
Flora of Southern Africa
Asphodelaceae genera
Taxa named by John Gilbert Baker
Taxa named by John Charles Manning